Into the Badlands may refer to:

 Into the Badlands (film), a 1991 television film;
 Into the Badlands (TV series), a 2015–2019 television series